The Three Million Trial is a 1926 Soviet silent comedy film starring Igor Ilyinsky and directed by Yakov Protazanov based on the play The Three Thieves by Umberto Notari. It was also released as Three Thieves in the United States.

Plot
To prepare grounds for yet another speculation, the banker Ornano (Mikhail Klimov) sells his house for three million rubles, but since it's the weekend he cannot deposit the money in a bank and must carry it with him. He leaves the city for his country home for a short period of time, only to return right away owing to his worries about the money. His wife sends a note to her lover telling him that there are three million in the house but the note, owing to the machinations of one of the three thieves on whom the film focuses, is intercepted. The note, falling into hands of the thief/adventurer Cascarilla (Anatoly Ktorov) causes him to plot his attempt to steal the money. Meantime, the small-time burglar Tapioca (Igor Ilyinsky) also chooses the same night to break into the house.

Cast
 Igor Ilyinsky – Tapioka
 Anatoly Ktorov – Cascarilla
 Mikhail Klimov – Ornano, the Banker
 Olga Zhizneva – Noris, the Banker's wife
 Nikolai Prozorovsky – Guido
 Vladimir Fogel – Man with binoculars

References
.
.

External links

  (English subtitles)

1926 comedy films
Soviet comedy films
Russian comedy films
1926 films
Gorky Film Studio films
Soviet black-and-white films
Soviet silent feature films
Films directed by Yakov Protazanov
Articles containing video clips
1920s business films
Russian silent feature films
Russian black-and-white films
Silent comedy films
1920s Russian-language films